is a Japanese romantic comedy film directed by , written by  and starring Haruka Ayase and Takumi Saito. It was released in Japan by Toho on June 4, 2016.

Cast
Haruka Ayase as Kie Hirano
Takumi Saito as Mitsumasa Kōdai
Kiko Mizuhara as Shigeko Kōdai
 as Kazumasa Kōdai
Mao Daichi as Yūko Kōdai
Masachika Ichimura as Shigemasa Jr.
Charlotte Kate Fox
Takurō Ōno
Kaho
Kentaro Sakaguchi
Muga Tsukaji

Promotion
The film was announced in September 2015. A teaser trailer was released in January 2016.

Release
The film was released on June 4, 2016.

References

External links
 

Japanese romantic comedy films
2016 romantic comedy films
Live-action films based on manga
Toho films
Films about telepathy
2010s Japanese films